Arocephalus is a genus of true bugs belonging to the family Cicadellidae.

The genus was first described by Ribaut in 1946.

The species of this genus are found in Europe.

Species:
 Arocephalus punctum Flor, 1861

References

Deltocephalinae
Cicadellidae genera